The Collegium of Foreign Affairs was a collegium of the Russian Empire responsible for foreign policy from 1717 to 1832. 

The Collegium of Foreign Affairs was created by Peter the Great as part of his government reforms to replace the existing Ambassadorial Prikaz, with Fyodor Golovin as its first President. It served as Russia's foreign ministry until it was replaced by the new Ministry of Foreign Affairs in 1802, and continued to exist as a child agency of the Ministry until it was abolished in 1832.

References 
 
 

Collegia of the Russian Empire
1717 establishments in Russia